Muhammad Khusenkhojaev (born 2 June, 1987) is a Tajikistani chess International Master.

Chess career
He has represented his country in a number of chess olympiads, including 2006, 2012, 2014, 2016 and 2018.

He played in the Chess World Cup 2017, in which he was defeated by Maxime Vachier-Lagrave  in the first round.

References

External links 

Muhammad Khusenkhojaev chess games at 365Chess.com

1987 births
Living people
Tajikistani chess players